Martin John Dickinson (born 14 March 1963) is an English former footballer who played as a centre-back. He played in the Football League with Leeds United, West Bromwich Albion and Sheffield United. He retired in 1989 as a result of whiplash.

Martin now applies his trade as a window cleaner, owning his own window cleaning empire.

References

1963 births
Living people
English footballers
Footballers from Leeds
Association football central defenders
Leeds United F.C. players
West Bromwich Albion F.C. players
Sheffield United F.C. players
English Football League players